The , operated by the private railway operator Tobu Railway, connects Tatebayashi Station located in Tatebayashi, Gunma to Nishi-Koizumi Station located in Ōizumi, Gunma as well as Higashi-Koizumi Station in Ōizumi town to Ōta Station in Ōta, Gunma Japan.

Stations

Abandoned stations 
 Shin-Koizumi Station - Sengoku-Kashi Station
 Kobugannon Station (between Higashi-Koizumi Station and Shinozuka Station)

History 
The first section of the line from Tatebayashi Station to Koizumimachi Station was opened for passenger service on March 12, 1917, operated by the Chūgen Railway, which was purchased by Tobu Railway company in 1937.

The 3 km  from Koizumimachi Station to  opened on April 13, 1939, as a freight-only branch line. Passenger services as far as Nishi-Koizumi commenced in 1941.

In 1941, Higashi-Koizumi Station to Ōta Station section opened on June 1, 1941, to service the Nakajima Aircraft Company Ōta and Koizumi plants. The lines were electrified in 1943.

The Nishi-Koizumi to Sengoku freight branch closed in 1976, and freight services ceased on the line in 1996.

References
This article incorporates material from the corresponding article in the Japanese Wikipedia.

External links
History of Tobu Railway 

Lines of Tobu Railway
Rail transport in Gunma Prefecture
Railway lines opened in 1917
1067 mm gauge railways in Japan